Sa-Fire is the first studio album by pop artist Sa-Fire. It was released in 1988 on Mercury Records.

Track listing

US CD Edition

Personnel
Marc Anthony, La India, Jeff Mann, Carl West, Maria Nocera, Susan Didrichen, David Harris, Denise Baez, Gary Filadelfo, Jacqueline S. Bonnen, Lucia Greco, Mark Frazer, Lauren Zeid: Vocal Backing
Mac Quayle, Tony Moran, John Brunkvist, Peter Schwartz, Allen Spears: Keyboards
Albert Cabrera: Keyboards, Vocal Backing
Russ DeSalvo: Guitars, All Instruments on track 3
Tristan Avakian, Glenn Schick: Guitars
Mike Theodore: Percussion
Albert Cabrera: Percussion (Cymbals), Vocal Backing
Aldo Marin: Drum Programming
Carlos Rodgers: Drum Programming, Vocal Backing
Steve Greenfield: Saxophone
Peter Campell: Other Programming

Charts
Album - Billboard (United States)

Singles - Billboard (United States)

References

1988 debut albums
Sa-Fire albums
Mercury Records albums